Marta Fernández Infante (born 6 August 1994, in Burgos) is a Spanish Paralympic swimmer from Valladolid, Spain. She has cerebral palsy. At the 2020 World Para Swimming European Open Championships (her first international event), she won one gold medal (in the 50m butterfly S5) and three silvers (in the 50m breaststroke SB3, 100m freestyle S4, and 50m freestyle S4), as well as breaking a world record (in the 50m butterfly S4). At the 2020 Summer Paralympics, she won a silver medal in the 50 metre butterfly S5 event, a gold medal in the 50 metre breaststroke SB3 event, and a bronze medal in the 50m freestyle S4. She broke her own world record in the 50 metre butterfly S4.

References 

Living people
1994 births
Paralympic swimmers of Spain
Spanish female backstroke swimmers
Spanish female butterfly swimmers
Paralympic silver medalists for Spain
Swimmers at the 2020 Summer Paralympics
Sportspeople from Valladolid
Sportspeople from Burgos
S4-classified Paralympic swimmers
Medalists at the World Para Swimming Championships
21st-century Spanish women